The 2013-14 season was the 74th season of Wisła Kraków in Ekstraklasa.

Season review

Squad

Transfers

Summer transfer window

Arrivals 
 The following players moved to Wisła.

Departures 
 The following players moved from Wisła.

Winter transfer window

Arrivals 
 The following players moved to Wisła.

Departures 
 The following players moved from Wisła.

Competitions

Friendlies

Ekstraklasa

Regular season

Results summary

Results by round

Matches

League table

Championship round

Results summary

Results by round

Matches

League table

Polish Cup

Squad statistics

Appearances and goals

|-
|}

Top scorers

Disciplinary record

References

External links

Wisła Kraków seasons
Wist